Pharmacis castillanus is a moth of the family Hepialidae. It is known from Spain.

References

Moths described in 1883
Hepialidae
Moths of Europe